"Bonzo's Montreux" is a drum solo by Led Zeppelin drummer John Bonham. It was recorded in September 1976 at Mountain Studios in Montreux, Switzerland, with electronic effects later added by Jimmy Page.  The track was released on the 1982 compilation album, Coda.

"Bonzo's Montreux" was never performed live at Led Zeppelin concerts, however, Bonham performed parts of the song during "Moby Dick" in 1977.

Reception
In a contemporary review of Coda, Kurt Loder of Rolling Stone gave the track a positive review, praising Bonham's "drum orchestra" and the electronic effects added by Page. Loder further described the track as being "true to the spirit of Sandy Nelson, and thus vestigially nifty at the very least."

References

1976 songs
Led Zeppelin songs
Rock instrumentals
Song recordings produced by Jimmy Page
Songs written by John Bonham